Brenton is a census-designated place (CDP) in Wyoming County, West Virginia, United States. As of the 2010 census, its population is 249.

Sue Cline (1946-2021), West Virginia State Senator and businesswoman, lived in Brenton.

References

Census-designated places in West Virginia
Census-designated places in Wyoming County, West Virginia
Populated places on the Guyandotte River